PUR Gum is a brand of aspartame-free gum produced by The PUR Company Inc. and founded in 2010 by Jay Klein in Toronto, Ontario, Canada. PUR gum and mints are manufactured in Switzerland, distributed in Canada, and sold in over 25 countries worldwide. PUR gum and mints are also sold through online outlets such as Amazon. The PUR Company Inc. uses the slogan "Kick Aspartame" to promote their sugar-free and aspartame-free products.

History 
In 2010, entrepreneur Jay Klein aimed to create a chewing gum that was vegan, gluten-free, nut/soy-free, allergen-free, and aspartame-free. The result was naturally sweetened PUR Gum that contains no additives or chemicals and is non-GMO.
Klein decided to sweeten the chewing gum with xylitol so it would be a healthy choice for diabetics, pregnant women, people with dietary sensitivities, and any person seeking to avoid chemicals.

Klein marketed his product first in the Greater Toronto Area by starting small and going door-to door, "running for mayor". Then they expanded to the rest of Canada and major U.S. metropolitan areas, where “health hubs” – areas with significant markets for health food products – could be found. However, PUR's popularity started to take off after a chain of airport duty-free shops started carrying the product, which made the brand gain international popularity that spread virally through airports and other channels. The number of international markets grew from three, to six, to ten, and then over 25.

In 2014, PUR Gum made an appearance on CBC's Dragon's Den, asking for $1 million in exchange for a 10% equity stake, valuing the company at $10 million. Three Dragons made offers and Jay Klein accepted an on-air deal with Jim Treliving and Arlene Dickinson.

In 2016, The PUR Company became Canada's 10th Fastest-Growing Company and Toronto's 4th Fastest-Growing Company with 5-year revenue growth of 5,496 percent. On the Profit 500 2016 list, The PUR Company ranked #10 overall and #1 in the Manufacturing and Distributing Category.

Bubblegum and Chocolate Mint were the newest flavors that the company has launched in 2016.

Products
Chewing gum
 Cinnamon
 Coolmint
 Peppermint
 Spearmint
 Wintergreen
 Pomegranate Mint
Chocolate Mint
Bubblegum

Mints
 Mojito Lime Mint
 Peppermint
 Polar Mint
 Spearmint
 Tangerine Tango

References

External links 
 Official website

Products introduced in 2010
Chewing gum
Canadian brands